Lorentz Harboe Ree (12 March 1888– 8 March 1962) was a Norwegian architect.

Ree was born at Stange in Hedmark, Norway. He graduated from the Norwegian Institute of Technology in 1915. He first worked as an architectural assistant in Bergen (1916–17).  He had his own architectural firm in Kristiania (now Oslo) from 1918. He worked together with Harald Aars  (1875–1945) from 1919 and from 1920 with Carl Emil Buch (1892-1968).

Most of the buildings he designed were raised in the Oslo districts of Frogner and St. Hanshaugen as well as the neighborhood of Bislett. His style was often in  neo-baroque, although he also preferred neo-classic style.   His main work was the Vigeland Museum (Vigeland-museet) for which he was awarded the Houen Foundation Award together with Carl  Buch in 1926.

Selected works

Statens Skogskole, Steinkjer (1923)
Kinopaléet (1923–24)
Nore I kraftverk  in Buskerud (1925–26) 
Ullevål stadion (1925–26)
Leiegård, Bygdøy allé 85 (1929)
Villa for Søren Onsager, Sogn hageby (1931)
Townhouse,  Ottar Birtings gt. 7–9 (1932)
Townhouse,  Majorstuvn. 17 (1935)
Leiegård, Gabels gt. 46/Vestheimgt. 6 (1936–37)
Leiegård, Frederik Stangs gt. 35 (1940)
Drammen gymnas (1954)

Gallery

References

1888 births
1962 deaths
People from Stange
Architects from Oslo
Norwegian Institute of Technology alumni